Mamatheya Madilu is a 1985 Indian Kannada-language film, directed by  Eeranki Sharma and produced by J. Chandulal Jain. The film stars Ambareesh, Geetha, Sandhya and Srinivasa Murthy. The film has musical score by M. S. Viswanathan.

Cast

Soundtrack
The music was composed by M. S. Viswanathan.

References

External links
 

1985 films
1980s Kannada-language films
Films scored by M. S. Viswanathan